NHRA is the National Hot Rod Association, a governing body for drag racing in the U.S. and Canada.

NHRA may also refer to:
 National Health Regulatory Authority (Bahrain)
 National Horseracing Authority, South Africa, officially NHA although sometimes known as NHRA in news reports
 National Reining Horse Association, an American organization to promote the reining horse
 National Heritage Resources Act, the basis for designating National heritage sites of South Africa